James Augustine Walsh (September 17, 1906 – May 2, 1991) was a United States district judge of the United States District Court for the District of Arizona.

Education and career

Born in Westfield, Massachusetts, Walsh received a Bachelor of Laws from Georgetown Law in 1928. He was in private practice in Mesa, Arizona from 1928 to 1941, and was a city attorney for the City of Mesa from 1936 to 1940. He was an Assistant United States Attorney of the District of Arizona in 1943. He was a county attorney of Maricopa County, Arizona from 1943 to 1944, and was a Judge of the Superior Court of Maricopa County from 1945 to 1947. He returned to private practice in Phoenix, Arizona from 1947 to 1952, and was chief counsel to the Arizona Code Commission from 1951 to 1952.

Federal judicial service

On July 3, 1952, Walsh was nominated by President Harry S. Truman to a seat on the United States District Court for the District of Arizona vacated by Judge Howard C. Speakman. Walsh was confirmed by the United States Senate on July 5, 1952, and received his commission on July 7, 1952. He served as Chief Judge from 1961 to 1972, and assumed senior status on July 9, 1976. He served in that capacity until his death on May 2, 1991.

Honor

The James A. Walsh United States Courthouse in Tucson, Arizona was renamed in Walsh's honor in 1985.

References

Sources
 

1906 births
1991 deaths
Georgetown University Law Center alumni
People from Mesa, Arizona
People from Westfield, Massachusetts
Judges of the United States District Court for the District of Arizona
United States district court judges appointed by Harry S. Truman
20th-century American judges
Arizona state court judges
20th-century American lawyers
Assistant United States Attorneys